Oasis Academy Brislington is a mixed gender secondary school with academy status, located in the Brislington West area of Bristol, England.

History
As Brislington Enterprise College it was a foundation school administered by Bristol City Council. It acted as a Business and Enterprise specialist college and Teaching Development Agency  designated training school. After a negative Ofsted inspection in 2014 it was converted to academy status, sponsored by Oasis Trust, in February 2015 and was renamed Oasis Academy Brislington.

As Brislington Enterprise College, it had appeared on the Channel 4 episode, Dispatches: The Children Left Behind, on 11 February 2008. as well as a number of episodes for Teachers TV.

Building
New buildings, designed and built by Skanska, were opened at the beginning of September 2008 and officially opened in October 2008 by Kevin McCloud. The sixth form common room was opened at the end of the 08/09 year as the old "clc building"  was reused as the ASD (Autism Spectrum Disorder) Centre. The old buildings were demolished and landscaped.

Brislington Enterprise College
The school's last inspection took place on 20 and 21 May 2014 and it received a 'requires improvement' overall and in every category. It decided to change its status to an academy sponsored by the Christian charity Oasis Community Learning.

Description
This is a 920 student secondary school, with provision for an 35 place autism unit, and a 20 place speech and language disorder unit. 
 The Oasis Trust has legal responsibility for the academy and an academy council, with representatives are from the local community, parents and the trust, forms the local governing body it reports through the regional director to the national board of the trust. The proportion of pupils entitled pupil premium funding is above the national average.

Three years after the refactoring, in 2018, Ofsted was still of the opinion that the academy 'requires improvement' and in the text commented that the new regime was making the necessary improvements but the expected outcomes were not yet measurable.

In 2021, Ofsted were under the impression that the academy was ‘good’. In the inspection report of the school, under a section called ‘What does the school need to improve?’. It states ‘Teachers provide guidance, scaffolding and prompts to support pupils to learn. However, sometimes, teaching does not allow pupils to extend their knowledge as well as they could. Leaders need to ensure that planned work on how to develop a challenging curriculum has the desired impact.’

Oasis
Oasis Academy Brislington is part of the Oasis Community Learning group, and evangelical Christian charity. The trust have guided forty schools out of special measures. 19 per cent of the 52 Oasis academies classified as failing. The trust's founder Reverend Steve Chalke says "Turning round a school is sometimes a quick fix, it really, truly is. And sometimes it’s a really long, hard, hard job".

Oasis has a long term strategy for enhancing the performance of its schools. Firstly it has devised a standard curriculum, that each school can safely adopt knowing it will deliver the National Curriculum. Secondly it has invested in staff training so they are focused on improving the outcomes for the students, and thirdly, through its Horizons scheme it is providing each member of staff and student with a tablet.

Curriculum
Virtually all maintained schools and academies follow the National Curriculum, and there success is judged on how well they succeed in delivering a 'broad and balanced curriculum'. Schools endeavour to get all students to achieve the English Baccalaureate qualification – this must include core subjects a modern or ancient foreign language, and either History or Geography.

See also
Oasis Academy Brightstowe
Oasis Academy John Williams

References

Secondary schools in Bristol
Training schools in England
Academies in Bristol
Brislington
Educational institutions established in 2015
2015 establishments in England